Wabu High School (also known as Wabu, or Wabu HS; Hangeul: 와부고등학교, 와부고; Hanja: 瓦阜高等學校) is a public college preparatory school located in Namyangju, Gyeonggi, South Korea.
It was the first public autonomy high school(Hangeul: 자율형 공립 고등학교) in South Korea.

Motto

An upright mind (Hanja: 正心)
A proper conduct (Hanja: 正行)

History 

 November 7, 2007 : Designated open mold autonomy school.
 January 7, 2008 : Licensed establishment of Wabu High School. 
 March 1, 2008 : Open a school. Hak-il Kim take office as 1st principal. 
 March 1, 2010 : Designated public autonomy high school.
 March 1, 2012 : Gwang-woo Shin take office as 2nd principal.

High schools in South Korea
Schools in Gyeonggi Province
Namyangju
Educational institutions established in 2008
2008 establishments in South Korea